John Coleman Moore (May 27, 1923 – January 1, 2016) was an American mathematician. The Borel−Moore homology and Eilenberg–Moore spectral sequence are named after him.

Early life and education 
Moore was born in 1923 in Staten Island, New York. He received his B.A. in 1948 from the Massachusetts Institute of Technology and his Ph.D. in 1952 from Brown University under the supervision of George W. Whitehead.

Career 
Moore began his career at Princeton University as an instructor, and was eventually promoted to full professor in 1961. He retired from Princeton in 1989, after which he took a half-time position at the University of Rochester.

His most-cited paper is on Hopf algebras, co-authored with John Milnor. As a faculty member at Princeton University, he advised 24 students and is the academic ancestor of over 1000 mathematicians. He was an Invited Speaker at the International Congress of Mathematicians in 1958 in Edinburgh and in 1970 in Nice.

In 1983, a conference on K-theory was held at Princeton in honor of Moore's 60th birthday. In 2012, he became a fellow of the American Mathematical Society. He died in 2016 at the age of 92.

Publications

References

1923 births
2016 deaths
People from Staten Island
20th-century American mathematicians
21st-century American mathematicians
Mathematicians from New York (state)
Topologists
Massachusetts Institute of Technology alumni
Brown University alumni
Princeton University faculty
University of Rochester faculty
Fellows of the American Mathematical Society